Krzywy Domek (Polish for "crooked house") is an unusually shaped building in Sopot, Poland.

Krzywy Domek was built in 2004.

It was designed by Szotyńscy & Zaleski, who were inspired by the fairytale illustrations and drawings of Jan Marcin Szancer and Per Dahlberg. It can be entered from either Monte Cassino or Morska Streets.

Gallery

See also
 Dancing House
 Crooked Forest

References

Buildings and structures in Sopot
Twisted buildings and structures
Postmodern architecture
Buildings and structures completed in 2004
Tourist attractions in Pomeranian Voivodeship